The men's featherweight (60 kilograms) event at the 1958 Asian Games took place on 26 May 1958 at the National Stadium Gymnasium in Tokyo, Japan.

Each weightlifter performed in clean and press, snatch and clean and jerk lifts, with the final score being the sum of the lifter's best result in each. The weightlifter received three attempts in each of the three lifts; the score for the lift was the heaviest weight successfully lifted.

Lee Taik-yong of South Korea won the gold medal.

Schedule
All times are Japan Standard Time (UTC+09:00)

Results

References

External links
Official Report

Weightlifting at the 1958 Asian Games